The 1994 UCI Mountain Bike World Championships were held in Vail, Colorado, United States from 18 to 19 September 1994.

Medal summary

Men's events

Women's events

Medal table

References

External links

UCI Mountain Bike World Championships
1994 UCI Mountain Bike World Championships
UCI Mountain Bike World Championships
Mountain biking events in the United States